This is a list of aircraft carriers which are currently in service, under maintenance or refit, in reserve, under construction, or being updated. An aircraft carrier is a warship with a full-length flight deck, hangar and facilities for arming, deploying, and recovering aircraft. The list only refers to the status of the ship, not availability or condition of an air wing. This includes helicopter carriers and also amphibious assault ships, if the vessel's primary purpose is to carry, arm, deploy, and recover aircraft.

Summary

Commissioned carriers

Carriers in reserve

Carriers undergoing sea trials

Carriers under construction

Carriers ordered

Other planned carriers

Carriers currently being updated

See also
 List of aircraft carriers (all time)
 List of aircraft carriers by configuration
 List of aircraft carriers by country
 List of sunken aircraft carriers
 Timeline for aircraft carrier service

References

Bibliography

In Service
Aircraft carriers